This is a list of what are intended to be the notable top hotels in Serbia, five or four star hotels, notable skyscraper landmarks or historic hotels which are covered in multiple reliable publications. It should not be a directory of every hotel in Serbia.

Belgrade

Niš

References

Hotels
 
Serbia